Myosotis maritima is a species of flowering plant in the family Boraginaceae endemic to the Azores. It is found in rocks, cliffs and coastal landslides, at altitudes generally below  (on the island of Flores, however, there are populations at altitudes close to ). It is present in all of the islands.

References

maritima
Endemic flora of the Azores